Shaw Millennium Park is a skatepark in Calgary, Alberta, Canada, on the western end of downtown Calgary, on the site of the former Mewata Stadium adjacent to Mewata Armouries. 

The  skatepark was built in 2000, and was the largest park of its kind in Canada. The park is sponsored by Shaw Communications. The skatepark is maintained by the City of Calgary Recreation Department.

It consists of a street course with ledges, flatbars, stairs and transitions, an intermediate course with rails down stairs and banks, and an advanced course with cloverleaf bowl, street course and a large fullpipe.

The facility is also used to host events such as the Calgary International Reggae Festival.

References

External links
 
 Shaw Millennium Park – City of Calgary

Sports venues in Calgary
Parks in Calgary
Buildings and structures celebrating the third millennium
Music venues in Calgary
Skateparks in Canada